Seney is an unincorporated community in Macon County, in the U.S. state of Missouri.

History
A post office called Seney was established in 1874, and remained in operation until 1904. The community has the name of Seney Price, an early settler.

References

Unincorporated communities in Macon County, Missouri
Unincorporated communities in Missouri